The Angola Basketball Cup is a basketball tournament held each year in the African state of Angola. There are sections for men's and women's teams. In the 2002/3 season the women's tournament took place on 3–14 January 2003, and the men's tournament in early June of that year. In both sections the winning team was Primeiro de Agosto.

2003 Angola Men's Basketball Cup

2003 Angola Women's Basketball Cup
The 2003 Women's Basketball Cup was contested by four teams, played under a preliminary round robin system, the top four of which qualified for the knockout rounds (semifinals and final) Primeiro de Agosto was the winner.

Preliminary rounds

Day 1

Day 2

Day 3

Day 4

Day 5

Knockout round

See also
 2003 Angola Basketball Super Cup
 2003 BAI Basket

References

Angola Basketball Cup seasons
Cup